Myddle, Broughton and Harmer Hill is a civil parish in Shropshire, England.  It contains 24 listed buildings that are recorded in the National Heritage List for England.  All the listed buildings are designated at Grade II, the lowest of the three grades, which is applied to "buildings of national importance and special interest".   The parish contains the villages and smaller settlements of Alderton, Broughton, Harmer Hill, and Myddle, and the surrounding countryside.  The oldest listed buildings are ruins; the remains of a church, a churchyard cross, and a castle.  Most of the other listed buildings are houses, cottages, farmhouses and farm buildings, the earliest of which are timber framed.  The rest of the listed buildings include churches and a chapel, a sundial in a churchyard, a public house, two mileposts, and a village pump and associated structures.


Buildings

References

Citations

Sources

Lists of buildings and structures in Shropshire